Cephaloglipa paumomuensis is a species of beetles in the family Mordellidae, the only species in the genus Cephaloglipa.

References

Mordellidae genera
Monotypic Cucujiformia genera